Thalassohelix is a genus of air-breathing land snails, terrestrial pulmonate gastropod mollusks in the subfamily Therasiinae of the family Charopidae.

Species
 Thalassohelix antipoda (Hombron & Jacquinot, 1841)
 Thalassohelix chathamensis (Suter, 1909)
 Thalassohelix igniflua (Reeve, 1852)
 Thalassohelix laingi (Suter, 1905)
 Thalassohelix obnubila (Reeve, 1852)
 Thalassohelix zelandiae (Gray, 1843)
Synonyms
 Thalassohelix minuta N. W. Gardner, 1967 accepted as Laomarex minuta (N. W. Gardner, 1967)
 Thalassohelix propinqua (F. W. Hutton, 1882) accepted as Therasia propinqua (F. W. Hutton, 1882)
 Thalassohelix prousei Powell, 1952 accepted as Phacussa prousei (Powell, 1952)
 Thalassohelix pygmaea Suter, 1913 accepted as Phrixgnathus celia F. W. Hutton, 1883
 Thalassohelix regia N. W. Gardner, 1968 accepted as Laomarex regia (N. W. Gardner, 1968)
 Thalassohelix translucens Gabriel, 1934 accepted as Mulathena fordei (Brazier, 1871) (junior synonym)

References

 Bank, R. A. (2017). Classification of the Recent terrestrial Gastropoda of the World. Last update: July 16th, 2017

External links
 Pilsbry, H. A. (1892). Observations on the helices of New Zealand. The Nautilus. 6(5): 54-57

Charopidae